The Ileanda is a right tributary of the river Someș in Romania. It discharges into the Someș in the village Ileanda.

References

Rivers of Romania
Rivers of Sălaj County